Locomotives SFAI 301-311 of the Società per le strade ferrate dell'Alta Italia (SFAI) were a group of steam locomotives derived from the rebuilding of some machines in the 31-80 series.

History
The machines, built by Stephenson in 1857-1858 with a  wheel arrangement, were modified with the installation of a new firebox. Between 1877 and 1882, six engines were rebuilt and numbered 292 to 297. Between 1884 and 1885, four more engines were rebuilt and one new one was purchased. The entire group was then renumbered as 301-311.

Ownership change
In 1885, with the creation of the great national networks, the machines were incorporated into the stock of the Rete Adriatica, which classified them as class 110 with numbers 1101-1111. They were all scrapped before 1905, so they did not transfer to the Ferrovie dello Stato.

References

Further reading
    Fabio Cherubini, Le Stephenson trasformate, "iTreni", 2011, 312.

2-4-0 locomotives
2-2-2 locomotives
Railway locomotives introduced in 1877
Standard gauge locomotives of Italy
Rete Adriatica steam locomotives